Aaron S. Watkin (born ) is a Canadian ballet company director and former dancer. In 2006, he became the artistic director of Dresden Semperoper Ballett. He is the incoming artistic director of the English National Ballet, to take office in August 2023.

Early life and training
Watkin was born and raised in Duncan, British Columbia. He began training at Canada's National Ballet School in 1983 and graduated in 1988. He received the first Erik Bruhn Memorial Award in 1988.

Career
Watkin began dancing with the National Ballet of Canada in 1988, after graduating. He left Canada for Europe at age 20, and danced at English National Ballet, where he remained for two seasons, Dutch National Ballet, William Forsythe's  and Nacho Duato's Spanish National Dance Company. In 2002, he became the associate artistic director at Victor Ullate Ballet. After he retired from performing, he also worked as Forsythe's choreographic assistant and staged his works across the world, including at the Kirov Ballet and Paris Opera Ballet.

In 2006, Watkin became the artistic director of Dresden Semperoper Ballett, after staging a Forsythe program there the previous year. At the time, Watkin was relatively unknown, and was offered the position when then-Semperoper general director Gerd Uecker asked Forsythe's advice on a candidate who could shift the ballet company's direction from a classical company to one with a more diverse repertoire, and Forsythe recommended Watkin. In order to pursue his vision, he let go of 25 dancers, half of the company, and recruited new ones across Europe. He also appointed David Dawson as resident choreographer and acquired works by contemporary ballet choreographers such as Forsythe, Jiří Kylián, Mats Ek, Alexander Ekman and Stijn Celis, as well as older works by George Balanchine, Martha Graham, Pina Bausch and John Neumeier. Watkin also staged his own productions of classical ballets for the company, including Swan Lake, The Sleeping Beauty, The Nutcracker and Don Quixote.

In August 2022, Watkin was announced as the incoming artistic director of the English National Ballet, three decades after he first danced there, succeeding Tamara Rojo. He is scheduled to take up the role in August 2023.

References

Living people
People from Duncan, British Columbia
Canadian male ballet dancers
Canadian artistic directors
National Ballet of Canada dancers
Dutch National Ballet dancers
English National Ballet dancers
20th-century ballet dancers
20th-century Canadian dancers
Canadian expatriates in England
Canadian expatriates in Germany
Canadian expatriates in the Netherlands
Canadian expatriates in Spain
Year of birth missing (living people)